Daniel Giansiracusa (born 11 March 1982) is a former Australian rules footballer who played for the Western Bulldogs in the Australian Football League (AFL). He had been used in various positions such as the midfield, half back flanks and half forward flanks. He currently serves as the defensive coach of the Essendon Bombers.

Playing career

Giansiracusa was selected by the Bulldogs in the 1999 AFL Draft with pick 32. He made his senior debut in round 11, 2001 against Adelaide at Football Park, and joined a special group of players when he goaled with his first kick.

After an exciting start to 2005 he missed 6 weeks due to injury but returned and ended up kicking 23 goals for the year. He had an outstanding game in round 18 against the Brisbane Lions collecting 27 possessions and kicking 2 goals. That same year he was chosen to represent Australia in International Rules.

Giansiracusa injured an anterior cruciate ligament (ACL) over the 2007–2008 off-season. The injury was not serious and he recovered in time for the 2008 season opener against Adelaide.

In 2010, Giansiracusa led the Bulldogs to the Nab Cup Grand Finale. He was acting captain due to Brad Johnson being absent. He led the Bulldogs to a 40-point victory against St Kilda. That same year he finished 3rd in the Bulldogs Best and Fairest.

Giansiracusa continued to display fine form in 2011, despite the team's poor season overall. He kicked 45 goals in 20 games playing mainly as a small forward, finishing second on the goalkicking list behind Barry Hall and seventh in the club's Best and Fairest Award count. He reached a personal milestone in Round 10 when he played his 200th game for the Bulldogs.

Providing an experienced head in the Western Bulldogs forward line, Giansiracusa's reliability around goals was imperative in 2012. In the 17 games he goaled on all but one occasion, while contributing multiple majors on eight occasions. He finished the year as the club's leading goal scorer.

In 2013, Giansiracusa began to substitute more regularly matches. His ability to be substituted late in games and make meaningful impacts led to him being called the "Super Sub". In round 19, Giansiracusa kicked an amazing alley-oop goal, which was a serious contender at being crowned Goal of the Year.

In 2014, Giansiracusa played his final season. Despite having limited game time he played a vital role for the Bulldogs, especially up forward. In round 3, after receiving a free kick he kicked a goal late in the final term to put the Bulldogs in front by 2 points and effectively win them the game against Richmond. Giansiracusa played his last game in round 23 against GWS, despite Giansiracusa playing well and kicking 2 goals the Bulldogs lost by 6 points.

Justin Koschitzke incident
In round 6, 2006, against St Kilda, midway during the third quarter the Western Bulldogs were heading downfield when Giansiracusa clashed heads with Justin Koschitzke, resulting in both players lying motionless for several minutes. Giansiracusa managed to get up but Koschitzke could not. Despite the severity of the incident, the AFL Tribunal decided Giansiracusa had no case to answer for this bump.

Coaching career
After retiring from playing, Giansiracusa became a forwards coach at the Western Bulldogs in 2015. In 2019 he was appointed as the senior coach of the Footscray VFL side. In 2020 due to the disrupted season he coached the Bulldogs' match simulation games and worked on opposition analysis. He was named as the AFL Coaches Association, Assistant Coach of the Year for 2020. In 2021 he joined the Essendon Football Club as an assistant coach.

Statistics

|- style="background-color: #EAEAEA"
! scope="row" style="text-align:center" | 2001
|
| 13 || 12 || 10 || 6 || 95 || 54 || 149 || 59 || 15 || 0.8 || 0.5 || 7.9 || 4.5 || 12.4 || 4.9 || 1.3
|- 
! scope="row" style="text-align:center" | 2002
|
| 13 || 22 || 25 || 21 || 234 || 135 || 369 || 122 || 34 || 1.1 || 1.0 || 10.6 || 6.1 || 16.8 || 5.5 || 1.5
|- style="background:#eaeaea;"
! scope="row" style="text-align:center" | 2003
|
| 13 || 21 || 20 || 11 || 222 || 124 || 346 || 85 || 41 || 1.0 || 0.5 || 10.6 || 5.9 || 16.5 || 4.0 || 2.0
|- 
! scope="row" style="text-align:center" | 2004
|
| 13 || 15 || 5 || 11 || 171 || 91 || 262 || 57 || 51 || 0.3 || 0.7 || 11.4 || 6.1 || 17.5 || 3.8 || 3.4
|- style="background:#eaeaea;"
! scope="row" style="text-align:center" | 2005
|
| 13 || 17 || 23 || 17 || 228 || 128 || 356 || 102 || 25 || 1.4 || 1.0 || 13.4 || 7.5 || 20.9 || 6.0 || 1.5
|- 
! scope="row" style="text-align:center" | 2006
|
| 13 || 16 || 13 || 3 || 197 || 124 || 321 || 97 || 39 || 0.8 || 0.2 || 12.3 || 7.8 || 20.1 || 6.1 || 2.4
|- style="background:#eaeaea;"
! scope="row" style="text-align:center" | 2007
|
| 13 || 22 || 22 || 13 || 252 || 150 || 402 || 131 || 61 || 1.0 || 0.6 || 11.5 || 6.8 || 18.3 || 6.0 || 2.8
|- 
! scope="row" style="text-align:center" | 2008
|
| 13 || 25 || 33 || 11 || 330 || 200 || 530 || 163 || 70 || 1.3 || 0.4 || 13.2 || 8.0 || 21.2 || 6.5 || 2.8
|- style="background:#eaeaea;"
! scope="row" style="text-align:center" | 2009
|
| 13 || 18 || 21 || 12 || 218 || 146 || 364 || 92 || 48 || 1.2 || 0.7 || 12.1 || 8.1 || 20.2 || 5.1 || 2.7
|- 
! scope="row" style="text-align:center" | 2010
|
| 13 || 25 || 35 || 13 || 297 || 192 || 489 || 130 || 94 || 1.4 || 0.5 || 11.9 || 7.7 || 19.6 || 5.2 || 3.8
|- style="background:#eaeaea;"
! scope="row" style="text-align:center" | 2011
|
| 13 || 20 || 45 || 18 || 229 || 135 || 364 || 114 || 56 || 2.3 || 0.9 || 11.5 || 6.8 || 18.2 || 5.7 || 2.8
|- 
! scope="row" style="text-align:center" | 2012
|
| 13 || 17 || 28 || 15 || 161 || 95 || 256 || 63 || 37 || 1.6 || 0.9 || 9.5 || 5.6 || 15.1 || 3.7 || 2.2
|- style="background:#eaeaea;"
! scope="row" style="text-align:center" | 2013
|
| 13 || 20 || 36 || 16 || 185 || 106 || 291 || 92 || 36 || 1.8 || 0.8 || 9.3 || 5.3 || 14.6 || 4.6 || 1.8
|- 
! scope="row" style="text-align:center" | 2014
|
| 13 || 15 || 15 || 10 || 100 || 63 || 163 || 41 || 18 || 1.0 || 0.7 || 6.7 || 4.2 || 10.9 || 2.7 || 1.2
|- class="sortbottom"
! colspan=3| Career
! 265
! 331
! 177
! 2919
! 1743
! 4662
! 1348
! 625
! 1.2
! 0.7
! 11.0
! 6.6
! 17.6
! 5.1
! 2.4
|}

Personal life
Giansiracusa attended Altona Meadows Primary School and Emmanuel College. He married his longtime partner, Kelly Tisdale, in December 2007. The couple currently have two children: daughter Ruby Iris (born in November 2008), and son Otis. 
He is the cousin of Podcast Personality Radio Mike

References

External links

 
 

1982 births
Living people
Australian rules footballers from Melbourne
Western Bulldogs players
Williamstown Football Club players
Australian people of Italian descent
Western Jets players
Australia international rules football team players